The Mirror is an album by the British rock band Spooky Tooth. It was the only Spooky Tooth album to be released without contributions from Mike Harrison. It also was their last album for nearly twenty-five years, until Cross Purpose in 1999.  The Mirror was released in October 1974, one month before group members had permanently disbanded. Members went on to form such bands as Foreigner and The Only Ones.

Reception 

In his review for AllMusic, Jason Anderson rates the album four stars out of five, and writes that "Elements of pop and gospel/R&B are all combined into a seamless rock delivery on The Mirror, giving the record a depth that is rare in the Spooky Tooth catalog."

In 2000, the album was re-released by Dressed to Kill Records with a completely different cover and imagery, plus a different sequencing of songs, as Comic Violence.

The title track "The Mirror" was sampled in Atmosphere's seminal track "Trying to Find a Balance" of their 2003 album Seven's Travels.

In Canada the album reached #88.

Track listing 

Side one
 "Fantasy Satisfier" (Mick Jones, Gary Wright) – 4:37
 "Two Time Love" (Jones, Mike Patto, Wright) – 3:30
 "Kyle" (Wright, with Splinter – Bill Elliott, Bob Purvis) – 3:36
 "Women and Gold" (Wright) – 3:36
 "Higher Circles" (Wright) – 5:23

Side two
 "Hell or High Water" (Patto, Wright) – 5:07
 "I'm Alive" (Wright) – 4:12
 "The Mirror" (Jones, Patto, Wright) – 5:21
 "The Hoofer" (Patto, Wright) – 3:57

Personnel 
 Mike Patto – vocals, electric piano, clavinet and organ
 Mick Jones – guitars, percussion and backing vocals
 Gary Wright – vocals, piano, clavinet, organ and moog synthesizer
 Val Burke – bass guitar, lead and backing vocals
 Bryson Graham – drums
 James SK Wān – zither

References

External links 
 

Spooky Tooth albums
1974 albums
Albums produced by Eddie Kramer
Albums produced by Mick Jones (Foreigner)
Island Records albums